WERT (1220 AM) is a radio station broadcasting adult standards featuring soft oldies from the 1940s through today. Licensed to Van Wert, Ohio, United States, the station serves Van Wert primarily but is considered part of the Lima market.  The station is currently owned by First Family Broadcasting and broadcasts from its studios on the Lincoln Highway (County Highway 418) just east of Van Wert.

History

From its first day of broadcasting on Thanksgiving Day in November 1958, WERT/1220, then owned by its local founder The Van Wert Broadcasting Company, has traditionally been a middle of the road formatted music station. WERT's original design engineer was also instrumental in the founding of WMVR in Sidney in 1963. The original owners also built and launched WERT-FM/98.9 in 1962, giving Van Wert its own FM service.  
WERT AM and FM were then sold to a California company in 1967 for $160,000, according to an article in that year's Van Wert Times Bulletin newspaper.  The west coast firm would absentee own and operate the stations for the next four years.  
Ray Livesay, from Matoon, Il. then purchased the local AM/FM combo in 1971 and operated it throughout much of the 1970s and 80s, boosting the power of WERT-FM to 50,000 watts in 1984. 
1988 saw another change in ownership when Atlantic Resources, based in Cincinnati, Ohio bought the stations for a reported $1 million with intentions to move the high power WERT-FM to Ft. Wayne, Indiana, where it remains today as 98.9 The Bear.  WERT was then paired with a new FM station licensed to Paulding, Ohio at 99.7 MHz and sold to Community Broadcasting of Van Wert in 1991.
In 1994 Chris Roberts (previously with WOWO in Fort Wayne) purchased the local stations after forming First Family Broadcasting, Inc.

Programming

WERT broadcasts a mix of adult standards from the '40s through today from its studios along historic Lincoln Highway. It is the heritage station serving the Van Wert area, and is co-owned with oldies/sports radio station WKSD 99.7 FM in Paulding (formerly WERT-FM; the original WERT-FM/98.9, is now WBYR serving the Fort Wayne market, and is no longer co-owned with WERT).

For many years WERT aired programming from ABC Radio's (now Citadel Media) "Timeless Favorites" format.  After "Timeless Favorites" was discontinued in February 2010, the station opted to return to locally originating programming.

A powerful windstorm powered by the remnants of Hurricane Ike caused damage to its transmitting tower on Sunday September 14, 2008. According to a WLIO-TV news story dated September 15, 2008, engineers from the Fort Wayne area along with Chief Engineer Chris Roberts, also the principal owner, worked feverishly to bring the station back on the air. In the interim, WERT continued to operate with reduced power by means of a temporary antenna and an internet audiostream until Friday September 19, 2008 when the new tower was finished.  The station returned to full power late in the afternoon on that day as reported by the Van Wert Independent newspaper.

Station Ownership
1958 - 1967 Van Wert Radio
1967 - 1971 California Radio
1971 - 1988 Livesay Broadcasting
1988 - 1991 Atlantic Resources
1991 - 1994 Community Broadcasting
1994 - Pres First Family Broadcasting, Inc.

References

External links

Lima, Ohio
ERT
Van Wert, Ohio
Radio stations established in 1958
1958 establishments in Ohio